The Colossus of New York is a 2003 book about the history of New York City by American writer Colson Whitehead.

The subtitle of the book reads "A City in 13 Parts."

References

2003 non-fiction books
English-language books
History of New York City
Books about New York City